The 2021 Argentine Primera División - Liga Profesional (officially the Torneo Socios.com for sponsorship reasons) was the 131st season of top-flight professional football in Argentina. The league season began on 16 July and ended on 13 December 2021.

Twenty-six teams competed in the league: the 24 teams that took part in the previous Primera División season as well as two promoted teams from the 2020 Primera Nacional (Sarmiento (J) and Platense). Boca Juniors were the defending champions.

River Plate won their 37th national league championship with three matches to spare after they defeated Racing 4–0 on 25 November 2021.

Competition format
The competition was run under a single round-robin, contested by 26 teams (24 from the previous edition plus 2 promoted from Primera Nacional). The champions qualified for the 2022 Copa Libertadores as Argentina 2. The qualification for international tournaments was determined by an aggregate table of the 2021 Primera División and 2021 Copa de la Liga Profesional first stage tournaments.

Club information

Stadia and locations

Personnel

Managerial changes 

Interim managers
1.  Pablo De Muner was interim manager in the 2021 Copa de la Liga Profesional Group stage 1st round.
2.  Gabriel Rinaldi and  Gastón Casas were interim managers during the remaining 18 minutes of the suspended 2021 Copa de la Liga Profesional Group stage 3rd round.
3.  Leandro Romagnoli was interim manager in the 2021 Copa Sudamericana Group stage 4th–6th rounds.
4.  Úbeda would be interim manager until the end of the tournament, but only was interim manager in the 6th–17th rounds.
5.  Interim manager until the end of the tournament. Battaglia was promoted to manager after the tournament.
6.  Adrián Adrover and  Sebastián Scolari were interim managers in the 10th round.
7. Interim manager, but later promoted to manager.
8.  Marcelo Mosset was interim manager in the 13th–14th rounds.
9.  Facundo Oreja and  Diego Villar were interim managers in the 14th round.
10.  Martín Anastacio was interim manager in the 16th round.
11. Interim manager until the end of the tournament.
12.  Hugo Donato was interim manager in the 18th round.
13. Interim managers until the end of the tournament.

Foreign players

Players holding Argentinian dual nationality
They do not take foreign slot.

 Joel Soñora (Banfield)
 Norberto Briasco (Boca Juniors)
 Frank Fabra (Boca Juniors)
 Lucas Barrios (Defensa y Justicia)
 Tomás Sosa (Defensa y Justicia)
 Vinicius Lansade (Estudiantes (LP))
 Matías Soria (Godoy Cruz)
 Alan Soñora (Independiente)
 Gabriel Arias (Racing)
 Ezequiel Schelotto (Racing)
 David Martínez (River Plate)
 Luca Martínez (Rosario Central)
 Néstor Ortigoza (San Lorenzo)
 Dylan Gissi (Unión)
 Carlos Lampe (Vélez Sarsfield)
 Lenny Lobato (Vélez Sarsfield)

Source: AFA

League table

Results 
Teams played every other team once (either at home or away) completing a total of 25 rounds.

Season statistics

Top goalscorers

Source: AFA

Top assists

Source: AFA

International qualification
The 2021 Argentine Primera División champions, 2021 Copa de la Liga Profesional champions and 2019–20 Copa Argentina champions earned a berth to the 2022 Copa Libertadores, while the 2020 Copa de la Liga Profesional play-off winners qualified for the 2022 Copa Sudamericana. The remaining berths to the 2022 Copa Libertadores as well as the ones to the 2022 Copa Sudamericana were determined by an aggregate table of the 2021 Argentine Primera División and 2021 Copa de la Liga Profesional first stage tournaments. The top three teams in the aggregate table not already qualified for any international tournament qualified for the Copa Libertadores, while the next five teams qualified for the Copa Sudamericana.

Aggregate table

Relegation
Relegation at the end of the season would be based on coefficients, which take into consideration the points obtained by the clubs during the present season (aggregate table points) and the two previous seasons (only seasons at the top flight are counted). The total tally is then divided by the number of games played in the top flight over those three seasons and an average is calculated. The three teams with the worst average at the end of the season would have been relegated to Primera Nacional. Relegation was suspended by AFA at the end of the 2019–20 season until 2022 due to the COVID-19 pandemic, however, the points earned in this season will count towards relegation in the 2022 season.

Source: AFA

References

External links
 LPF official site

Argentine Primera División seasons
2021 in Argentine football